Ofosu Asamoah (born 25 November 1969) is a lawyer and was the member of parliament  representing Kade constituency in the Eastern region of Ghana.

Early life and education 
Ofosu was born on 25 November 1969. He hails from Kade, a town in the Eastern region of Ghana. He obtained his Bachelor of Arts degree in Law and Political Science at the University of Ghana in 1994. He went on to obtain his Bachelor of Law at the Ghana School of Law in 1997.

Political career 
Ofosu is a member of New Patriotic Party. He was a committee member for Constitution, Legal and Parliamentary, Subsidiary Legislation. He became a member of the 5th Parliament of the 4th Republic of Ghana representing Kade constituency after he was re-elected into office in the 2008 Ghanaian General Elections. He had a run of 4 terms in office starting in January 2001 and left office in January 2017.

Elections 
In the year 2000, Asamoah won the general elections as the member of parliament for the Kade constituency of the Eastern Region of Ghana. He won on the ticket of the New Patriotic Party. His constituency was a part of the 18 parliamentary seats out of 26 seats won by the New Patriotic Party in that election for the Eastern Region.The New Patriotic Party won a majority total of 99 parliamentary seats out of 200 seats. Asamoah was elected with 20,319 votes. This was equivalent to 62.20% of the total valid votes cast. He was elected over Faustina Koranteng Addo  of the National Democratic Congress, George Ankomah Yeboah of the Convention People’s PartyAppiah-Twum Barimah of the People's National Convention and Ohene Antwi Tutu  of the National Reformed Party. These won 11,369, 588, 238 and 176 votes out of the total valid votes cast respectively. These were equivalent to 34.80%, 1.80%, 0.70% and 0.50% respectively of total valid votes cast.

Career
Ofosu is a lawyer. He was a partner at Kimberly Chambers. He became a member of the parliament of Ghana in January 2001.

Personal life 
Ofosu is married with four children. He is a Christian (Presbyterian).

References 

Living people
University of Ghana alumni
1969 births
New Patriotic Party politicians
Ghanaian MPs 2001–2005
Ghanaian MPs 2005–2009
Ghanaian MPs 2009–2013
21st-century Ghanaian politicians
Ghanaian Presbyterians
21st-century Ghanaian lawyers
People from Eastern Region (Ghana)